The Palestine national under-23 football team, also known as the Palestine Olympic football team, represents Palestine in international football competitions in the Olympic Games, the Asian Games, and the AFC U-23 Asian Cup, as well as any other under-23 international football tournament. The team also serves as the national under-22 football team of Palestine.

The selection is limited to players under the age of 23, except for the Olympics which allows the men's team up to three overage players. The team is controlled by the Palestinian Football Association. The side has never qualified for the Olympic Games. They have participated five times in the Asian Games and once in the AFC U-23 Asian Cup.

Competitive record

Summer Olympic Games

AFC U-23 Asian Cup

WAFF U-23 Championship

Asian Games

Recent results and matches

2022

Players

Current squad

Previous squads
AFC U-23 Asian Cup
 2018 AFC U-23 Asian Cup squad

Asian Games
 Asian Games 2002 squad
 Asian Games 2006 squad
 Asian Games 2010 squad
 Asian Games 2014 squad
 Asian Games 2018 squad

See also
 Palestine national football team
 Palestine national under-20 football team
 Palestine national under-17 football team
 Football in Palestine

References

U23
Asian national under-23 association football teams